Danielewicz is a Polish-language surname, of patronymic origin, meaning descendants of Daniel or Danilo. Notable people with this surname include:

Danielewicz families, several Polish noble families
Wincenty Danilewicz (1787-1878), - Chevau-léger (light-horse cavalryman) in campaigns of the Napoleonic Wars; Secretary of Chancellery of Senate of Poland (Polish: Senat) in Congress Poland; chief archivist of heraldry administration of Congress Poland, in Warsaw. 
Adam Danielewicz (1846–1935), Polish statistician
Sigismund Danielewicz (1847–1927), California trade union organizer and anarchist
  (born 1942), Polish classical philologist 
  (1921-1997), Polish historian 
Krzysztof Danielewicz (born 1991), Polish footballer
Ludomir Danilewicz - Polish engineer, one of the directors of AVA together with Leonard Danilewicz, helped to break the Enigma Code

Polish-language surnames
Surnames from given names